Sin tetas no hay paraíso (Without Breasts There Is No Paradise) is a Colombian telenovela, produced, and aired by Caracol TV.  The show is based on the best-selling novel of the same name written by Gustavo Bolivar.

The story is based on a young girl, Catalina, who lives in Pereira and becomes obsessed with getting breast implants in order to overcome poverty. Catalina decides to become a "prepago" (prepaid), a prostitute who has sex with drug traffickers in exchange for gifts, money, and social status.

The complete, uncut series was released on DVD in the United States under the title Sin Pechos No Hay Paraíso on October 13, 2009, by DistriMax Inc.; the five-disc set includes English subtitles.

Telemundo aired this series on February 8, 2010, with English captions on CC3. When it premiered, the word "Tetas" was censored out and replaced with an image of a bra in between the first T and the final S because its English translation "tits" was censored from broadcast television by the FCC. This show lasted for about one month as there were only 23 episodes produced.

Plot
Catalina (María Adelaida Puerta) is a young, beautiful girl living in extreme poverty with her brother, Bayron (Andrés Toro) and her mother, Hilda  (Patricia Ércole), in Pereira, Colombia. Catalina becomes obsessed with getting breast implants in order to escape poverty and gain social status and money. She abandons her boyfriend, Albeiro (Nicolas Rincón) and, is guided by her best friend, Yésica (Sandra Beltrán), a ruthless pimp who has also involved Catalina's friends into the business, Ximena, Paola and Vanesa, to get to drug traffickers who pay for sexual services.

As the story progresses, Catalina becomes obsessed with gaining more and more money. She even puts her life, Yésica's life and her mother's life in jeopardy by threatening a prominent drug dealer, Titi (Marlon Moreno) that she would snitch on him. Eventually Catalina marries Marcial Barrera (Fabio Restrepo), another drug trafficker and starts a life full of luxury, corruption, bribing and killings. Her brother Byron has strayed as well, having become a hitman. Meanwhile, her former boyfriend Albeiro and her mother Hilda, apparently the only characters in the story that keep their integrity up to the end, start a relationship behind her back. Catalina has lost her integrity entirely by treating otherwise atrocious actions (paid murders, blackmailing, bribing) as casual events needed to gain status and money.

Catalina snitches Titi to the Police in order to earn the $1 million award and prepares to leave Marcial as soon as he secures a financial support for her in his will. However she faces serious implications from her low quality breast implants, undergoes several surgeries to replace them and she is eventually obliged to remove them, having been warned that she will die unless she abandons all the breast implant business for at least two years. Yésica, realizing that Marcial will soon get bored of Catalina, takes the opportunity and betrays her, getting romantically involved with Marcial herself. She eventually persuades Marcial to marry her and abandon Catalina without money.

At the end, Catalina realizes how miserable her life is since she became a call-girl. The fact that her ex-boyfriend Albeiro and her Mother were having a relationship behind her back, the death of her brother Byron (who was shot down by the police after having murdered a target as a hired killer), the loss of her implants, her kicking out of Marcial's home and the betrayal of her best friend, Yésica, all these events cause Catalina to lose the will to live, and, not having the courage to commit suicide, she decides to seek revenge and kill Yésica for betraying her. She hires killers to murder Yésica by inviting her to a café and giving them directions that Yésica is dressed a certain way and sitting at a table by herself reading a book. The killers kill the girl by shooting her, later to be shown that the girl killed is actually Catalina, who had a change of mind and she instead decided to plot her own assassination  by disguising herself as Yésica. The story ends with a somewhat more mourning form of the title song, "El Agujero".

Cast
 Maria Adelaida Puerta as Catalina Santana
 Patricia Ercole as Doña Hilda
 Sandra Beltrán as Yesica "La Diabla"
 Nicolas Rincón as Albeiro Manrique
 Andrés Toro as Byron Santana
 Marlon Moreno as Aurelio Jaramillo "El Titi"
 Jenni Osorio as Ximena
 Marilyn Patiño as Paola
 Margarita Rosa Arias as Vanesa
 Fabio Restrepo as Marcial Barrera
 Ernesto Benjumea as Octavio
 Cristóbal Errázuriz as Cardona
 Ramses Ramos as Pelambre
 Karola Sánchez as Daniela Mejía
 Luces Velásquez as Margot
 Mauricio Mejía as Profesor Mariño
 Juan Carlos Pérez Almanza as Makinón
 Saín Castro as Doctor Molina
 Carlos Manuel Vesga as Portero Carrillo

See also
 Without Breasts There Is No Paradise
 Sin Senos no hay Paraíso
 List of famous telenovelas

References

External links
 Canal Caracol: Sin Tetas No Hay Paraiso (Colombia, South America)
 Breast-Obsessed TV Show a Colombian Hit
 Miguel Angel Silvestre: Website about one of the most popular characters of the series

2006 telenovelas
2006 Colombian television series debuts
2006 Colombian television series endings
Colombian telenovelas
Caracol Televisión telenovelas
Spanish-language telenovelas
Works about child prostitution
Works about Colombian drug cartels
Television shows set in Colombia